Trachypepla leucoplanetis is a moth of the family Oecophoridae first described by Edward Meyrick in 1883. It is endemic to New Zealand and has been collected in both the North and South Islands. It is the smallest moth species in the genus Trachypepla and the patterns on the forewings of adults are variable in appearance. It inhabits native forest and bush and the larvae feed on leaf litter. Adults are on the wing from October until February. T. leucoplanetis is regarded as being rarely observed and has been collected via the beating of foliage.

Taxonomy 
This species was first described by Edward Meyrick in 1883 using specimens collected in dense forest in Hamilton and at Ōtira gorge. A fuller description of this species was given by Meyrick in 1884. The male genitalia of this species was studied and illustrated by Alfred Philpott in 1927. George Hudson discussed and illustrated this species in his 1928 book The butterflies and moths of New Zealand. The male lectotype, collected in Hamilton, is held at the Natural History Museum, London.

Description

Meyrick described this species as follows:

This species is the smallest in the genus Trachypepla and can be variable in the markings on the forewings. The colouration of the forewings of this species camouflages the insect when at rest as it gives the appearance of a small bird dropping.

Distribution

This species is endemic to New Zealand. It has been found on both the North and South Islands, including in Auckland, Hamilton, National Park, Wellington, at the Ōtira River and on Mount Arthur's lower slopes. Both T. H. Davies and George Hudson were of the opinion that this species is rarely observed.

Habitat and hosts
The preferred habitat of T. leucoplanetis is native forest. Larvae of this species feed on leaf litter.

Behaviour
Adults of this species are on the wing from October until February. This species has been collected by beating foliage.

References 

Moths described in 1883
Oecophoridae
Taxa named by Edward Meyrick
Moths of New Zealand
Endemic fauna of New Zealand
Endemic moths of New Zealand